In Chinese mythology, the Fuzanglong is the Chinese dragon of hidden treasures and an underworld dragon which guards buried treasure, both natural and man-made. Volcanoes are said to form when these dragons burst out of the ground to report to heaven. Several tiles and light reliefs depict Fuzanglong dragons serving as mounts to Immortals

The Fuzanglong possesses a magic pearl which is its most treasured possession.

In popular culture
 Fuzanglong appears in the digital card game Cabals: Magic & Battle Cards.

References

Chinese dragons